Joanna Burzyńska (born 28 July 1968) is a Polish windsurfer. She placed 9th in the women's Lechner A-390 event at the 1992 Summer Olympics.

References

External links
 
 
 

1968 births
Living people
Polish windsurfers
Female windsurfers
Polish female sailors (sport)
Olympic sailors of Poland
Sailors at the 1992 Summer Olympics – Lechner A-390
People from Pisz County